Numbers of Sri Lankan internally displaced persons displaced from the Vanni region since October 2008 and detained by the Sri Lankan Military at various camps in northern and eastern Sri Lanka during May 2009:

1. Andiyapuliyankulam School camp was closed in early May 2009 and IDPs moved to Menik Farm Zone 2.
2. Muthaliyankulam Maha Vidyalayam camp was closed in early May 2009 and IDPs moved to Menik Farm Zone 2.
3. Pampamadhu Hostel School camp was closed on 27 May 2009 and IDPs moved to Kodikamam Ramavil.
4. Chavakachcheri Hindu College camp was closed in late May 2009 and IDPs moved to Kodikamam Ramavil.
5. Kodikamam Thirunavitkarasu Maha Vidyalayam camp was closed in late May2009 and IDPs moved to Kodikamam Ramavil.

References

Refugee camps in Sri Lanka
IDP 2009-05
IDP 2009-05